Francisco López de Zárate (1580–1658) was a Spanish poet, playwright and writer.

Works
Several poems (Varias poesías), 1619.
Heroic poem of the invention of the Cross ( Poema heroico de la invención de la Cruz)
Several works, Alcala, 1651
Hercules and Oeta furente, Senecan tragedy (Hércules Furente y Oeta, tragedia senequista).
The galley reinforced comedy (La galeota reforzada, comedia).
Works, edited by José Simón Díaz Madrid: National Research Council, 1947, 2 vols.

Spanish male writers
1580 births
1658 deaths